The 2010–11 Ukrainian First League was the 20th since its establishment.  Eighteen teams competed in the competition. Two teams were promoted from the 2009–10 Ukrainian Second League and a third team replaced a team that withdrew from the competition.

The competition began on July 17, 2010, with six matches. The competition had a winter break and resumed March 19, 2011.

Promotion and relegation

Promoted teams
These three teams were promoted from the 2009–10 Ukrainian Second League
Group A
Bukovyna Chernivtsi – champion (returning after nine seasons)
Nyva Vinnytsia – Playoff winner (returning after four seasons)

Group B
Tytan Armyansk – champion (debut)

Relegated teams
Two teams were relegated from the 2009–10 Ukrainian Premier League

 Chornomorets Odesa – 15th place (returning after eight seasons)
 Zakarpattya Uzhhorod – 16th place (returning after a season)

Playoff game
At the meeting of the Professional Football League of Ukraine, it was confirmed that FC Desna Chernihiv failed attestation for the season and hence would have their license withdrawn. To allow an extra team to be promoted, the PFL determined that a playoff game between the 2nd placed teams from Druha Liha –
Kremin Kremenchuk and Nyva Vinnytsia would determine the vacancy created. This playoff game was played June 28, 2010.

 Nyva Vinnytsia were promoted into the First League, while Kremin Kremenchuk remain in the Second League.

Team locations

Map
The following displays the location of teams.

Stadiums 
The following stadiums were used during the season.

Managers

Managerial changes

Final standings

Relegation playoff
The relegation playoff match was played between the 16th place team of the First League and the winner of another playoff game between the second placed clubs from each group of the Second League.

Withdrawn teams

Feniks-Illichovets Kalinino 
At the end of the winter break Feniks-Illichivets Kalinino administration notified the PFL that their club was in liquidation and would withdraw from the league. All of their spring fixtures are considered technical losses. The club competed in twenty games in the League and had a record of 3 wins, 2 draws and 14 losses and 1 technical loss with 17 goals scored and 48 allowed.

Results

Top scorers

See also
 2010–11 Ukrainian Premier League
 2010–11 Ukrainian Second League
 2010–11 Ukrainian Cup

References

Ukrainian First League seasons
2010–11 in Ukrainian association football leagues
Ukra